Balša Sekulić (born 10 June 1998) is a Montenegrin professional footballer who plays as a forward for Budućnost Podgorica.

Club career
On 18 June 2022, Sekulić joined K League 1 side Gangwon FC.

References

External links
 

1998 births
Living people
Association football forwards
Montenegrin footballers
Montenegro under-21 international footballers
Montenegro international footballers
FK Cetinje players
FK Budućnost Podgorica players
OFK Titograd players
FK Podgorica players
FK Iskra Danilovgrad players
Gangwon FC players
Montenegrin First League players
K League 1 players
Montenegrin expatriate footballers
Expatriate footballers in South Korea
Montenegrin expatriate sportspeople in South Korea